Live at Tin Angel is the second self-published album by American singer-songwriter Susan Werner, released in 1993 (see 1993 in music).

Track listing
All songs written by Susan Werner, except where noted

"So Heavy" – 3:41
"The Great Out There" (Greg Simon) – 4:21
"Still Believe" – 5:28
"Last of the Good Straight Girls" – 2:58
"Snow White" – 3:23
"My Mother's Garden" – 4:21
"Shackamaxon Street" – 3:34
"Intro: Attend the Sky" – 0:35
"Attend the Sky" – 3:52
"Soul's Not at War" – 4:27
"Maybe If I Sang Cole Porter" – 4:04
"Society Ball (Just the Band)" – 1:55
"La Vie en Rose" (Mack David, Marcel Louiguy, Edith Piaf) – 2:50
"Intro: Ain't I Lonely" – 0:54
"Ain't I Lonely Tonight" – 3:51

Personnel
Susan Werner – vocals, acoustic guitar, piano, keyboard

Production
Engineer: George Pierson
Mastering: Glenn Barratt
Cover design: Susan Werner

Susan Werner albums
1993 live albums